2009 Bintang Popular Berita Harian Awards (2009 Most Popular Artiste Berita Harian Awards) was held on April 4, 2010 on Arena of Stars, Genting Highlands as an appreciation for artists and most entertaining artists in 2009. The show was broadcast live by TV3. The winner of Most Popular Artiste, Dato’ Siti Nurhaliza defeated Mawi that had won three times in row before.

Nominees and Winners

Most Popular Male Singer
Adam
Akim
Aizat
Faizal Tahir
Mawi

Most Popular Female Singer
 Jaclyn Victor
 Mila
 Dato’ Siti Nurhaliza
 Stacy
 Yuna

Most Popular Group/Duo
 Adam & Stacy
 Bunkface
 Hujan
 Meet Uncle Hussain & Black
 6ixth Sense
 Fire Twelve

Most Popular Nasyid
 Hijjaz
 In-Team
 Rabbani
 Raihan
 Saujana

Most Popular Film Actor
 Aaron Aziz
 Afdlin Shauki
 Farid Kamil
 Que Haidar
 Zul Huzaimy

Most Popular Film Actress
 Diana Danielle
 Lisa Surihani
 Liyana Jasmay
 Maya Karin
 Sharifah Amani

Most Popular TV Actor
 Aaron Aziz
 Fahrin Ahmad
 Fizz Fairuz
 Fizo Omar
 Remy Ishak

Most Popular TV Actress
 Fasha Sandha
 Noorkhiriah
 Rozita Che Wan
 Scha Alyahya
 Tiz Zaqyah

Most Popular Male TV Host
 AC Mizal
 Ally Iskandar
 Aznil Nawawi
 Faizal Ismail
 Nabil

Most Popular Female TV Host
 Cheryl Samad
 Fara Fauzana
 Nurul Syuhada
 Raja Azura
 Sarimah Ibrahim

Most Popular Male Radio Presenter
 AG
 Aznil Nawawi
 Din Beramboi
 Faizal Ismail
 Kieran

Most Popular Female Radio Presenter
 Abby Fana
 Fara Fauzana
 Nana
 Linda Onn
 Natasya

Most Popular Male Comedy Artist
 AC Mizal
 Afdlin Shauki
 Nabil
 Saiful Apek
 Zizan

Most Popular Female Comedy Artist
 Aliza Abdullah
 Didie Alias
 Kenchana Dewi
 Norkhiriah
 Nik Sayyidah

Most Popular Male New Artist
 Akim
 Aril
 Black
 Gambit
 Hafiz

Most Popular Female New Artist
 Dira Abu Zahar
 Isma
 Putri Mardiana
 Tiz Zaqya
 Yuna

Lifetime Achievement Award
 Datuk Khadijah Ibrahim

Most Popular Artist
 Dato’ Siti Nurhaliza

References

Genting Highlands
Malaysian music awards